This is a list of Royal Navy seaplane carriers.

Key

Ships

Seaplane carriers
Royal Navy
 
Royal Navy seaplane carriers